Kathy Foster may refer to:

Kathy Foster (musician), American musician
Kathy Foster (basketball), Australian basketball player

See also
Katherine Foster (disambiguation)
Kathleen Foster (disambiguation)